Raymond "Tank" Austin was a baseball pitcher in the Negro leagues. He played with the Nashville Elite Giants and Birmingham Black Barons in 1930 and the Atlanta Black Crackers in 1932.

Career
Austin started the first game of the 1930 Negro National League season for the Nashville Elite Giants. He was relieved by Rosey McCauley in a losing effort against the St. Louis Stars.  

His final recorded game came with the Atlanta Black Crackers in 1932, when he faced the Montgomery Grey Sox on June 19, 1932. He pitched either four or five innings, depending on the source, in a losing effort.

References

External links
 and Seamheads 

Atlanta Black Crackers players
Birmingham Black Barons players
Nashville Elite Giants players
Year of birth missing
Year of death missing
Baseball pitchers